The Shan Nationalities League for Democracy (abbreviated as SNLD) is a political party in Myanmar (Burma). The party was established on 26 October 1988, and campaigns for the interests of the Shan people. The SNLD became the largest Shan party in the Assembly of the Union following the 2015 general election. The party is a federal party having local branches in most townships in Shan State and few in other states and regions such as Kayah, Kachin, and Mandalay.

Unlike other Shan political parties, the party prefers a federal system with 8 states or 8 units to have equal political rights in upper house as the original principle based on the Federal Principles of 1961, rather than the status quo of 7 states and 7 regions.

History
The Shan Nationalities League for Democracy was founded by Hkun Htun Oo, the nephew of  Sao Kya Seng, the last Saopha of the Hsipaw State. The party was formally registered in 1988. In the 1990 general election, the party won the second highest number of seats (23 seats out of 58 constituencies), which was unrecognized by the ruling military junta.

From 1993 and 1996, members of the party attended the National Convention (NC) and Dialogue, where several opposition groups met with the military junta to negotiate peace treaties. There, the SNLD demanded "striving for national  reconciliation in order to build a genuine democratic union". However, the Working Committee of the National Convention Convening Commission ignores SNLD's demands as well as other democratic forces. When the National Convention re-convene again in  2004, SNLD denied to send representatives joining the Convention. In February 2005, the party's leaders were arrested under accused charges on forming Shan State Advisory Expert Group, and were given long prison sentences.

The party had been openly against the 2008 constitution, and it boycotted the 2010 general election, along with other opposition parties, such as the National League for Democracy and its alliance members United Nationalities Alliance (UNA). Following that the party was de-registered under the new Union Election Commission of Myanmar in 2010. In 2012, following constitutional and government reforms, political prisoners, including the leaders of the SNLD, were released, and the SNLD was permitted to operate legally and re-register for elections.

In 2012 by-Election, the party did not contest. Instead, SNLD took outside parliament's path working on peace process and national reconciliation. In November 2012, SNLD cooperating with other Shan political parties, cease-fire armed groups and Shan civil society organizations, took its first initiative convening a three days conference of "Trust Building for Peace" aiming to seeking solutions, building trust among different groups to achieve genuine peace.

In March 2013, SNLD along with other ethnic political parties, cease-fired armed groups in Shan State and Kayah State organized another three days conference of Trust Building for Peace, Shan State & Kayah State in Lashio, Shan State projecting to figure out the common grounds, understanding among others. Similarly to that, in late 2013, the party collaborating other democratic forces such as ethnic political parties, cease-fired armed groups and civil society organization organize its third conference of Trusting Building for Peace, Shan, Kayah, and Mon State.

The SNLD went on to run successfully in the 2015 election, winning 3 seats in the Amyotha Hluttaw, 12 seats in the Pyithu Hluttaw and 25 seats in the State and Regional Hluttaws (24) in the Shan State Hluttaw, and 1 in the Kachin State Hluttaw). This makes the SNLD the 4th largest political party elected to the Pyidaungsu Hluttaw (Assembly of the Union) and the 5th largest overall. Many SNLD gains in the election took place at the expense of the Shan Nationalities Democratic Party, which was reduced from being the 2nd largest party in Shan State and the 3rd largest party nationally, to holding only a single seat in the Shan State Hluttaw.

References
 Shan Nationalities League for Democracy

Political parties established in 1988
Burmese democracy movements
1988 establishments in Burma
Political parties in Myanmar
Shan State